After This Our Exile (父子, literally Father-Son) is a 2006 Hong Kong drama film directed by Patrick Tam. A critical hit, the film won both the Hong Kong Film Award for Best Film and the Golden Horse Award for Best Feature Film awards, as well as netting Aaron Kwok his second consecutive win for the Golden Horse Award for Best Actor, after having won the award for his performance in Divergence the previous year.

Plot
In hopeless pursuit of happiness, Shing (Aaron Kwok) is a man who desperately attempts to hold on to the dwindling threads of his family. Once a man who had a dream, Shing has become a deadbeat gambler whose marriage is failing with wife Lin (Charlie Yeung). Shing's machoistic ego over-rides any reasonable logic for change, which forces Lin to leave Shing repeatedly. After finally managing to escape, Shing is left with nothing but his son, Lok-Yun (Goum Ian Iskandar).

Hoping in vain to pay back loansharks, Shing turns to his loving son, Lok-Yun, who has somehow retained his filial loyalty. In his most desperate hour, Shing forces his struggle of survival onto his son, Lok-Yun, through thievery and tests the strength of loyalty and the boundaries of trust in their father-son relationship. With each passing day, the bond of love is threatened with Shing's unrepentant ways.

Cast
 Aaron Kwok as Chow Cheung-Sheng
 Charlie Yeung as Lee Yuk-Lin
 Gouw Ian Iskandar as Chow Lok-Yun
 Kelly Lin as Fong
 Qin Hailu as Ha Je
 Valen Hsu as Jennifer
 Lester Chan as Strong Man
 Lan Hsin-mei
 Allen Lin as Sick boy's father
 Qin Hao as School bus driver
 Chui Tien-you as Chow Lok-yun (young adult)
 Wang Yi-xuan as Sick boy's mother
 Xu Liwen as Rich boy's mother
 Faith Yang
 Mak Kwai-Yuen
 Mok Kam-Weng
 Daniel Yu

Release
The movie runs for 121 minutes, but a 159 minutes long director's cut has been released in Hong Kong. The director's cut was also shown at the Asia Society in New York City on Friday, 20 July 2007, as a part of the Asian American International Film Festival.

Awards and nominations
1st Rome Film Festival
 Competition Section

11th Busan International Film Festival
 Official Selection

Tokyo International Film Festival
 Best Artistic Contribution
 Best Asian Film

10th Toronto Reel Asian International Festival
 Opening Film

43rd Golden Horse Awards
 Won: Best Feature Film
 Won: Best Actor (Aaron Kwok)
 Won: Best Supporting Actor (Gouw Ian Iskandar)
 Nominated: Best New Performer
 Nominated: Best Original Screenplay
 Nominated: Best Cinematography
 Nominated: Best Makeup & Costume Design

26th Hong Kong Film Awards
 Won: Best Picture
 Won: Best Director (Patrick Tam)
 Won: Best Supporting Actor (Gouw Ian Iskandar)
 Won: Best Screenplay
 Won: Best New Performer (Gouw Ian Iskandar)
 Nominated: Best Actor (Aaron Kwok)
 Nominated: Best Supporting Actress (Kelly Lin)
 Nominated: Best Cinematography
 Nominated: Best Editing

References

External links
 

 

2006 films
2006 drama films
Hong Kong drama films
2000s Cantonese-language films
Films about father–son relationships
Best Film HKFA
Best Feature Film Golden Horse Award winners
Films directed by Patrick Tam (film director)
Chinese New Year films
Films set in Malaysia
Films shot in Malaysia
2000s Hong Kong films